Youssy Pierre (born August 8, 1985 in Montreal, Quebec) is a Canadian football wide receiver who is currently a free agent. He played for the Edmonton Eskimos of the Canadian Football League. He was drafted 46th overall in the 2011 CFL Draft by the Eskimos and signed with the team on May 31, 2011. He was released by the Eskimos during training camp on June 17, 2012 and was later brought back to the practice roster. He played CIS football with the Montreal Carabins.

References

External links
Edmonton Eskimos player bio

1985 births
Living people
Canadian football wide receivers
Edmonton Elks players
Montreal Carabins football players
Players of Canadian football from Quebec
Canadian football people from Montreal